Shilpa Shirodkar (born 20 November 1973) is an Indian actress and former photo model who worked primarily in Hindi-language films from 1989 to 2000. After a 13-year hiatus from acting, she made her comeback to acting, this time on television in the Zee TV series Ek Mutthi Aasmaan in 2013.

Career
Shirodkar made her debut with Ramesh Sippy's film Bhrashtachar (1989), with Mithun Chakraborty and Rekha, in which she played the role of a blind girl. She starred opposite Anil Kapoor in the hit 1990 film Kishen Kanhaiya. The following year she had successful films like Trinetra (1991) and Hum (1991). She appeared in several other hit films such as Khuda Gawah (1992), Aankhen (1993), Pehchaan (1993), Gopi Kishan (1994), Bewafa Sanam (1995) and Mrityudand (1997). She decided to quit acting after marriage and her last film appearance was in the 2000 film Gaja Gamini. She was nominated for the Filmfare Award for Best Supporting Actress for Khuda Gawah. Shilpa paired in nine films with Mithun Chakraborty and fans appreciated their onscreen pairing.

She took a 13-year hiatus from show business to raise her family in London and in 2013 made her comeback on television after shifting residence to Mumbai. The first shooting location was in a Delhi suburb for her comeback, Zee TV's new show Ek Mutthi Aasmaan, based on the life of domestic helpers. The series finished in late 2014.

Her second television serial Silsila Pyar Ka aired on Star Plus on 4 January 2016 and ended six months later in June. From May 2017 to September 2018, she appeared in the Colors TV serial Savitri Devi College & Hospital. In February 2020, she made a comeback to films playing a supporting role in Guns of Banaras, a film which had been completed in 2014 but was delayed for six years.

Personal life
Born to Marathi actress Gangu Bai on 20 November 1973, Shilpa Shirodkar, is the younger sister of actress and former Miss India Namrata Shirodkar and grand-daughter of Meenakshi Shirodkar. She married United Kingdom based banker Aparesh Ranjit in 2000. They have a daughter together named : Anushka, in 2003 December.

Filmography

Television

Awards and nominations

See also

List of Indian film actresses

References

External links

1973 births
Living people
Actresses in Hindi cinema
Actresses in Hindi television
20th-century Indian actresses
Indian film actresses
Indian television actresses
Indian soap opera actresses
21st-century Indian actresses
Place of birth missing (living people)